Md. Abdul Quddus is a Bangladesh Awami League politician and the incumbent Member of Parliament from Natore-4.

Early life
Quddus was born on 31 October 1946.

Career
Quddus was elected to Parliament from Natore-4 on 5 January 2014 as a Bangladesh Awami League candidate. On 17 January 2016, he recovered bribes given to Jubo League and returned them to the villagers, the villagers gave the bribe for electricity connections to their homes.

References

Awami League politicians
Living people
1946 births
10th Jatiya Sangsad members
11th Jatiya Sangsad members
9th Jatiya Sangsad members
5th Jatiya Sangsad members
7th Jatiya Sangsad members
People from Natore District